Officials for the 2015 Cricket World Cup were selected by the Umpire selection panel and the information was released on 2 December 2014. Umpire selection panel selected 20 umpires to officiate at the World Cup: five were from Australia, five from England, five from Asia, two each from New Zealand and South Africa and one from West Indies. It also selected five match referees for the event.

The umpire selection panel consisted of Geoff Allardice (ICC General Manager - Cricket), Ranjan Madugalle (ICC Chief Match Referee), David Lloyd (former player, coach, umpire and now television commentator) and Srinivas Venkataraghavan (former elite panel umpire).

Umpires
Out of the selected umpires, twelve of them belong to the Elite Panel of ICC Umpires while the remaining eight belong to the International Panel of Umpires and Referees.

The members of the Elite Panel of ICC umpires are generally thought to be the best umpires in the world and hence officiate in almost all international cricket tournaments and ICC Events. The rest six of the International Panel of Umpires have been identified as emerging and talented match officials, who have already officiated at international level and are now ready to umpire in the World Cup.

Sources:

Referees
Five referees were also selected by the selection panel. All the selected referees belong to the Elite Panel of ICC Referees and are considered as the best cricket referees in the world.

References

officials
Cricket World Cup officials